New York's 2nd congressional district is a congressional district for the United States House of Representatives along the South Shore of Long Island, New York. It includes southwestern Suffolk County and a small portion of southeastern Nassau County. The district is currently represented by Republican Andrew Garbarino. 

Nassau County communities in the 2nd district include Oyster Bay and East Massapequa. Suffolk County communities include Amityville, Babylon, Lindenhurst, Captree, Deer Park, East Farmingdale, Gilgo, North Amityville, North Babylon, North Lindenhurst, Oak Beach, West Babylon, Wheatley Heights, Wyandanch, Copiague Harbor, Brightwaters, Islandia, Ocean Beach, Saltaire, Bay Shore, Bayport, Baywood, Bohemia, Brentwood, Central Islip, East Islip, Great River, Hauppauge, Holbrook, Holtsville, Islip, Islip Terrace, Kismet, Lake Ronkonkoma, Lonelyville, North Bay Shore, North Great River, Oakdale, Ronkonkoma, Sayville, West Bay Shore, West Islip, West Sayville, Dunewood, Fair Harbor, Blue Point, Patchogue, East Patchogue, North Patchogue, Medford, Hagerman, North Bellport, Bellport, Brookhaven, South Haven, Shirley, Mastic, Mastic Beach, Moriches, East Moriches, Center Moriches, Manorville, Eastport, Davis Park, Water Island, Fire Island Pines, Cherry Grove, Point O'Woods, and Ocean Bay Park.

From 2003 to 2013 it included all of the town of Huntington and parts of the towns of Babylon, Islip and Smithtown in Suffolk County as well as part of the town of Oyster Bay in Nassau County. It comprised such communities as Bay Shore, Brentwood, Central Islip, Commack, Deer Park, Dix Hills, Huntington, Melville, North Amityville, Northport, Oakdale, Plainview, Ronkonkoma, Sayville and Wyandanch.  Much of this area is now the 3rd congressional district, while most of the territory currently in the 2nd district was located in the 3rd district.

Demographics 
According to the APM Research Lab's Voter Profile Tools (featuring the U.S. Census Bureau's 2019 American Community Survey), the district contained about 512,000 potential voters (citizens, age 18+). Of these, 68% are White, 17% Latino, and 10% Black. Immigrants make up 15% of the district's potential voters. Median income among households (with one or more potential voter) in the district is about $109,400. As for the educational attainment of potential voters in the district, 32% hold a bachelor's or higher degree. As of 2022, this is the richest congressional district held by a republican.

Voting

List of members representing the district

1789–1805: one seat

1805–1809: Two seats on general ticket with 3rd district 

Gurdon S. Mumford is usually listed as member from the 2nd district, and George Clinton Jr. from the 3rd district, because Clinton was elected to fill the vacancy caused by the election of Mitchill to the U.S. Senate, and Mitchill had been elected previously in the 3rd district. However, in 1804 Mitchill was already re-elected on the 2nd/3rd general ticket, and both Clinton and Mumford were elected in special elections, receiving votes in both districts.

The districts were separated in 1809.

1809–1823: two seats
From 1809 to 1823, two seats were apportioned to the second district, elected at-large on a general ticket.

1823–present: one seat

Recent election results
New York election law allows for fusion voting, where a candidate can run as a member of multiple parties. The pooled vote totals for candidates are listed first, and the split of the votes among the parties they ran as is listed beneath. See below for blank, void, and scattering notes.*

 Blank, void, and write-in candidate ("scattering") notes: In 2000, there were 37,596 BVS votes; in 2002, 14,087; in 2004, 40,937; and in 2006, 14,101. Since 2008, results were separated out, and there were 54,163 blank votes; 10 void ballots; and 12 votes cast for write-in candidates. In 2010, 7,104 were blank votes; 93 were void ballots; and thirty were votes cast for write-in candidates.

See also

 List of United States congressional districts
 New York's congressional districts
 United States congressional delegations from New York

Notes

References
 
 
 Congressional Biographical Directory of the United States 1774–present
 National atlas congressional maps

02
Constituencies established in 1789
1789 establishments in New York (state)